Abhishek Avasthi (born 17 March 1982) is an Indian actor, choreographer, dancer and model.

Biography 

Abhishek Awasthi was born in Kanpur, India.

He, along with Rakhi Sawant, an Indian model and actress, participated in the third season of Nach Baliye, a reality dance show on Star Plus. They were among the top-two finalists and were declared the first runners-up on 22 December 2007. Soon after the show, they broke up.

In 2008, he played the role of Maninder Singh in Jugni Chali Jalandhar which aired on SAB TV. He also appeared in Zara Nach Ke Dikha on Star Plus and Chintu Chinki Aur Ek Badi Si Love Story and Tu Mere Agal Bagal Hai on SAB TV.

References 

1982 births
Indian choreographers
Indian male dancers
Indian male television actors
Living people
People from Kanpur
Male actors from Mumbai